Qingdao Jiaodong International Airport  is an airport serving the city of Qingdao in Shandong province, China. It received approval in December 2013, and replaced Qingdao Liuting International Airport as the city's main airport. It is located in Jiaodong, Jiaozhou,  from the center of Qingdao. The airport opened on 12 August 2021 and is currently the largest airport in Shandong, capable of handling 35 million passengers annually.

History

Timeline

June 2015 – Groundbreaking ceremony.

June 2016 – Hoisting of the first steel ball in the terminal building.

April 2017 – Start of construction phase.

October 2018 – Start of testing phase.

September 2019 – Start of large-scale decoration and equipment installation.

June 2020 – Terminal building construction and civil aviation professional project pass completion acceptance; project completion.

January 2021 – Two aircraft successfully completed test flights.

August 12, 2021 – Officially opened.

Facilities
The airport has two class 4F runways, both 3,600 meters long. The runways are able to handle extremely large aircraft, such as the Airbus A380. It has a  terminal building. The terminal is designed in a starfish shape, with 5 airside concourses jutting out of it.

Airlines and destinations

Passenger

Cargo

Transport

Metro
Jiaodong International Airport station (Qingdao Metro Line 8)

Railway
Qingdao Airport railway station (Jinan-Qingdao high-speed railway)

See also

List of airports in China
List of the busiest airports in China

References

Airports in Shandong
Transport in Qingdao
Airports established in 2021
2021 establishments in China